Schwarzgrätli is a mountain ridge near to the village of Kandersteg in Switzerland. It stands at 2383 metres above sea level and has a signpost along with a fantastic view.

Prior to walking this ridge there is another ridge around 2 feet wide with a sheer rock face up to the right and an 800-metre drop to the left with only a steel cable to hold onto.

Geography of Switzerland